The common name yellow crab may refer to any of the following species:
Eriphia verrucosa (Eriphiidae)
Hemigrapsus oregonensis (Varunidae)
Metacarcinus anthonyi (formerly Cancer anthonyi; Cancridae)

See also
Yellow crab spider, Misumena vatia

Animal common name disambiguation pages